The winter blues is another name for seasonal affective disorder

Winter Blues may refer to:
Winter Blues, book by Norman E. Rosenthal
"Winter Blues", 1927 song by Madlyn Davis
"Winter Blues", B-side of "Christmas (Baby Please Come Home)" (1965) 
Winter Blues, album by Edgar Winter